The 2012 Tulane Green Wave football team represented Tulane University in the 2012 NCAA Division I FBS football season.  The team was led by first-year head coach Curtis Johnson.  The Green Wave played home games in the Mercedes-Benz Superdome and competed in the West Division of Conference USA. This was their final season in Conference USA as the prepared to move to the American Athletic Conference. They finished the season 2–10, 2–6 in C-USA play to finish in a tie for fifth place in the West Division.

Pre-season

Recruits

Award watch lists

Cairo Santos
 Lou Groza Award Watch List

Orleans Darkwa
Doak Walker Award Candidate

Trent Mackey
Bronko Nagurski Trophy Watch List
Lombardi Award Watch List

Roster

Schedule

Game summaries

Rutgers

Tulsa

While the team trailed 35–3, senior Devon Walker fractured his cervical spine after colliding head-on with a teammate during a tackle.

Ole Miss

Louisiana–Monroe

Louisiana–Lafayette

SMU

UTEP

UAB

Rice

Memphis

East Carolina

Houston

Statistics
As of November 17, 2012

Team

Score by quarters

Offense

Rushing

Passing

Receiving

Defense

Special teams

After the season

Awards

Cairo Santos
Lou Groza Award
Consensus All-American

References

Tulane
Tulane Green Wave football seasons
Tulane Green Wave football